Edavaka  is a Grama Panchayath in the Wayanad district of the Kerala State, India.

Demographics
 India census, Edavaka had a population of 15,620 with 7,939 males and 7,681 females.

Major landmarks
 Thonichal Siva Temple 
Kalyanathum Palil Dargah
 St.George Church, Kallody
 Hidayath Madrasa
 St.Sebastians Church
Veera Pazhassi Vidya Mandiram
 Holy face school
 Venmani school
 Kannur University B.Ed Centre 
 Darussalam Madrasa Karakkuni
 Juma Masjid Karakkuni
 Juma Masjid West Palamukku
 Badr Juma Masjid East Palamukku
 Juma Masjid 2/4

Towns in the Panchayath
The following little towns are part of Edavaka panchayath jurisdiction. 
 Pallikkal
 Dwaraka
 Nalam Mile 
 Kallody
 Pandikkadavu
 Rande Nalu or Chundamukku
 Thonichal
 Moolithode
 Karakkuni

Cattle market
Every Tuesday and Friday, a cattle market is conducted in the village.  The Panchayath has built an expensive unwalled building for this purpose.

Transportation
Edavaka village is very near Mananthavady town. The Periya ghat road connects Mananthavady to Kannur and Thalassery.  The Thamarassery mountain road connects Calicut with Kalpetta. The Kuttiady mountain road connects Vatakara with Kalpetta and Mananthavady. The Palchuram mountain road connects Kannur and Iritty with Mananthavady.  The road from Nilambur to Ooty is also connected to Wayanad through the village of Meppadi.

The nearest railway station is at Mysore and the nearest airports are Kozhikode International Airport-120 km, Bengaluru International Airport-290 km, and   Kannur International Airport, 58 km.

References

Villages in Wayanad district
Mananthavady Area